Jonathan Klein (born June 23, 1987) is an American racing driver from Long Grove, Illinois.

After racing Formula Atlantic cars in the SCCA he moved up to professional racing in 2005 in Star Mazda, finishing 13th for Andersen Walko Racing. In 2006 he moved to the Indy Pro Series driving for Andretti Green Racing. At the time one of Andretti Green's IndyCar entries was sponsored by Klein Tools which at the time was headed by Jonathan Klein's father, Rick Klein. Klein finished second in Indy Pro Series points despite not winning, but did capture a pole at Kentucky Speedway, finishing second, and finished second in the season closer at Chicagoland Speedway. Klein returned to the series in 2007 driving for Team Moore Racing. Klein finished 12th in points with a best finish of 3rd (twice). He returned to the series (then called Firestone Indy Lights) and Team Moore for four late season races in 2008 in what were, as of 2010, his last professional race appearances.

References

External links
Official website

1987 births
Indy Lights drivers
Indy Pro 2000 Championship drivers
People from Long Grove, Illinois
Living people
Racing drivers from Illinois

Team Moore Racing drivers
Andretti Autosport drivers